Colorado Springs Notes, 1899–1900 (Published by Nolit: Beograd, Yugoslavia, 1978) is a book compiled and edited by Aleksandar Marinčić and Vojin Popović detailing the work of Nikola Tesla at his experimental station in Colorado Springs at the turn of the 20th century.

Preface

Tesla's notes at the Colorado Springs experimental station were unpublished until the release of this book.  Arrangements through the Nikola Tesla Museum allowed Aleksandar Marinčić to make commentaries on the notes. The Nikola Tesla Museum published the work to mark the 120th anniversary of Tesla's birth.

Introduction

Tesla was focused in his research for the practical development of a system for wireless transmission of power and a utilization system. Tesla said, in "On electricity", Electrical Review (Jan. 27, 1897):
"In fact, progress in this field has given me fresh hope that I shall see the fulfillment of one of my fondest dreams; namely, the transmission of power from station to station without the employment of any connecting wires."

Tesla went to Colorado Springs in mid-May 1899 with the intent to research:
Transmitters of great power.
Individualization and isolating the energy transmission means.
Laws of propagation of currents through the earth and the atmosphere.
Tesla spent more than half his time researching transmitters. Tesla spent less than a quarter of his time researching delicate receivers and about a tenth of his time measuring the capacity of the vertical antenna. Also, Tesla spent a tenth of his time researching miscellaneous subjects.

The authors notes J. R. Wait's comment on Tesla activity, 
 "From an historical standpoint, it is significant that the genius Nikola Tesla envisaged a world wide communication system using a huge spark gap transmitter located in Colorado Springs in 1899. A few years later he built a large facility in Long Island that he hoped would transmit signals to the Cornish coast of England. In addition, he proposed to use a modified version of the system to distribute power to all points of the globe".
The authors note that no alterations have been made to the original which still contains certain minor errors; calculation errors which influence conclusions are noted. The authors also note the end of the book contains commentaries on the Diary with explanatory notes.

June 1 to January 7

The main content of the book is composed of notes written by Tesla between June 1, 1899 to January 7, 1900.

Citations to the work
These publications have cited this book.
 VL Bychkov (2002). Polymer-composite ball lightning. Philosophical Transactions of the Royal Society A: Mathematical, Physical and Engineering Sciences
 A Marincic, D Budimir (2001). Tesla's contribution to radiowave propagation. Telecommunications in Modern Satellite, Cable and Broadcasting Service, 2001. TELSIKS 2001. 5th International Conference on
 Zoran Blažević, Dragan Poljak, Mario Cvetković, Simple Transmission Line Representation of Tesla Coil
 Aleksandar Marinčić, Zorica Civrić, Bratislav Milovanović, Nikola Tesla’s Contributions to Radio Developments

See also
Electrical engineering 
History
Electronics 
Tesla coil
Electric current
Alternating current
Experiment
High voltage

Further reading
 Richard Hull, (1993). The Tesla Coil Builder's Guide to The Colorado Springs Notes of Nikola Tesla. Tesla Coil Builders of Richmond.
 Margaret Cheney, (2001). Tesla: Man Out of Time. 400 pages.
 Margaret Cheney, Robert Uth, Jim Glenn (1999). Tesla, Master of Lightning. 184 pages.	
 Carol Dommermuth-Costa (1994). Nikola Tesla: A Spark of Genius. 128 pages.
 Thomas Valone (2002). Harnessing the Wheelwork of Nature: Tesla's Science of Energy. 288 pages.
 David Lindsay (2005). Madness in the Making: The Triumphant Rise & Untimely Fall of America's Show Inventors.

External links
 Colorado Springs Notes 1899-1900 
 Tesla Coil Builder's Guide to the Colorado Springs Notes of Nikola Tesla 
 Tesla's Colorado Springs Receivers
 Wardenclyffe and the World System
 Tesla Magnifier System 
 Welcome to IEEE Xplore 2.0: Nikola Tesla Colorado Springs Notes

1999 non-fiction books
Books about Nikola Tesla
History of Colorado Springs, Colorado
1899 in Colorado
1900 in Colorado
1899 in science
1900 in science